Navagatharkku Swagatham is a 2012 Malayalam campus-based film written by Kalavoor Ravikumar and directed by Jayakrishna Karanavar. Mainly filmed on locations at Kalamassery, the film stars Mukesh, Jyothirmayi, Rejith Menon, Shafna and Vinay Forrt in pivotal roles. The film's music is composed by late music maestro Johnson. The film was met with negative critical reviews and was declared as a box office flop.

Plot
The film is about an English lecturer who is like an elder brother to his students, a new boy named Prasanth joins them and they all become friends after a few ragging. Prasanth later confesses he likes Veena, a junior in the college, and the whole gang tries and gets Veena to fall in love with Prasanth but Sreelakha, also a lecturer, tells Veena its just a prank which the boys are playing which leaves Veena inconsolable, as soon as the English lecturer Appettan finds out he spills out the truth about Prasanths love from child hood to Veena, He also goes and tells Sreelakha but also says that a boy used to love her which leaves her in tears. Near the end of the film Appettan confesses that he was the boy that used to love Sreelakha but when he goes to express his love, he finds out that Sreelakha and her husband has decided to reunite which leaves Appettan heart broken but he receives a note which says she also loved him and her stubborn attitude was caused by Appettan because Appettan didn't express his love to her in the beginning.

Cast

References

2010s Malayalam-language films
2012 romance films
2012 films
Indian romance films
Films scored by Johnson